Olu Abejoye was the 10th Olu of Warri who ruled over the Itsekiri and non Itsekiri people in the kingdom.  He was the son to Olu Omoluyiri, the 9th Olu of Warri Kingdom. He succeeded his father, Olu Omoluyiri as the 10th Olu of Warri. His Portuguese name was Luigi. He was succeeded by his son Olu Akenjoye.

References

Nigerian traditional rulers
People from Warri
Year of birth unknown
Year of death unknown